Society's Finest is a metalcore band from Dallas, Texas. Their first full-length album, The Journey...So Far, was released on Solid State Records in May 2000. Due to member changes and personal matters the band took a break from touring and recording to focus on their personal lives. During this hiatus, vocalist Josh Ashworth toured with the metalcore band Zao.

When re-forming in 2004, the band joined Hand of Hope Records. With this label, they released Love, Murder, and a Three Letter Word in mid-2004. It contained new songs, along with old songs from their debut EP, Private Conflicts and Suicides (Pluto Records). Their third album, And I, the Drunkard, was released in June 2006.

Vocalist Josh Ashworth is the only remaining original member. Past members have gone on to join other bands including As I Lay Dying, Demon Hunter, and The Famine. The band has shared stages with P.O.D., Zao, The Dillinger Escape Plan, Living Sacrifice, Stretch Arm Strong, Hatebreed, and Stavesacre.

History

Society's Finest started in 1997 with the original members of Josh Ashworth (vocals), Rob Pruett (guitars), Kris McCaddon (guitars), Joel Bailey (bass), and Chad Wilburn (drums). The band recorded their debut EP, a split with My Spacecoaster, and their debut album, The Journey...So Far (released via Solid State Records) between 1998 and 2003.

The band reunited in 2004 with Ashworth, Bailey and multiple new members including Nick Nowell (guitars), Daniel Clark (guitars) and Lucas Laskaris (drums). The band recorded their second album, Love, Murder, and a Three Letter Word, in 2004.  Nowell and Poole left the band in 2006.

The band replaced Nowell and Poole with Guy Turner (guitars) and former drummer Chad Wilburn. However, in the process of writing, Wilburn quit. The band could not find a replacement, so they hired former Between the Buried and Me drummer Jason Roe. Roe recorded part of the album before they found a replacement, Jesse Smith, formerly of Zao. Though Smith stated he never actually joined the band. And I, the Drunkard was released on Alveran Records in 2006. The band broke up for the second time in 2011.

With a whole new line-up, Ashworth reunited the band with Tyler Berry (guitars), David Cezero (bass), and Jason Roe in 2014, for a celebration of the life of former guitarist Randall Watts. The band stated that they were currently writing for a new album, but no further information has been released. In 2017, Ashworth did an interview claiming that the band now consisted only of himself and former guitarist Eli Bowser. 

In 2021, the band announced a new release in the future with the lineup of Ashworth, Bowser, former bassist Daniel Barton, and Lasko(Laskaris) back on drums.

Members 
Current
 Josh Ashworth – lead vocals (1997–2003, 2004–2011, 2014–present)
 Joel Bailey – bass guitar (1997–2003, 2004–2006, 2022–present)
 Jordan Brady – drums (2002), bass guitar (2014), guitars (2022-present)
 Chad Wilburn – drums (1997–2001, 2005–2011, 2017–2021, 2022-present)

Former

 Kris McCaddon – guitar (1997–2001)
 Rob Pruett – guitar (1997–2000)
 Tim Lambesis – guitar (2000–2001)
 Kane Kelly – guitar (2000)
 James Allain – drums (2001–2002)
 Daniel Clark – guitar (2001–2003)
 Pete Rose – bass guitar (2003)
 Guy Turner – guitar (2004–2011)
 Nick Nowell – guitar (2004–2006)
 Randall Watts – guitar (2004–2005; deceased)
 Stephen Poole – drums (2004–2005)
 David Cerezo – bass guitar (2014–2016)
 Tyler Berry – guitar (2014–2016)
 Jason Roe – drums (2006, 2014–2016)
 Eli Bowser – guitar (2004–2011, 2016–2022)
 Daniel Barton – bass guitar (2006–2011, 2021–2022)
 Iasko – drums (2021–2022)

Discography 

 Studio albums

EPs
 Private Conflicts and Suicides (2000)
 The Difference Between Us (2001; split EP with Rise Over Run)
 My Spacecoaster & Society's Finest (1998; split EP with My Spacecoaster)

References

External links 

Solid State Records artists
Musical groups established in 1997
Musical groups disestablished in 2003
Musical groups reestablished in 2004
Musical groups disestablished in 2011
Musical groups reestablished in 2014
Musical quartets
American Christian metal musical groups
Metalcore musical groups from Texas